WDCI-LD is a low-power television station that is licensed in Chicago, Illinois. This station operates on RF digital channel 30 and is owned by Word of God Fellowship.

Digital programming

History
Prior to becoming a Daystar affiliate, this station was licensed in Elgin and it was owned by Trinity Broadcasting Network as a translator of full-power station WWTO-TV in LaSalle. The station started airing Daystar programming in August 2010 and changed their call letters to WDCI.

References

External links

DCI-LD
Low-power television stations in the United States
Daystar (TV network) affiliates